Bloom Center is an unincorporated community in Wood County, Ohio.

History
A variant name was Bloom. A post office called Bloom was established in 1854, but this post office was moved to Eagleville in about 1861. Besides the post office, Bloom Center had a schoolhouse, church, and cemetery.

References

Unincorporated communities in Wood County, Ohio
Unincorporated communities in Ohio